Pokémon is a media franchise based on a series of collectible creatures.

Pokémon or Pokemon may refer to:

Pokémon products 
Pokémon (video game series), a series of video games developed by Game Freak
 Pokémon (TV series), an anime series based on the video games
 Pokémon (2023 TV series), an upcoming anime series
 Pokémon Pocket Monsters, a manga series based on the video games
 Pokémon Trading Card Game, a collectible card game based on the video games

Fictional characters 
 List of Pokémon, the eponymous fictional characters upon which the franchise is based

Other uses 
Pokemón, a youth subculture in Chile
 Pokemon (gene), an oncogene now called Zbtb7
 "Pokémon", a track from the album Mouth Silence"
Operation Pokémon, a Spanish corruption investigation

See also 
Pokimane (Imane Anys, born 1996), Twitch streamer and YouTuber